An extension tube, sometimes also called a closeup tube or an extension ring, is used with interchangeable lenses to increase magnification. This is most often used in macro photography.

Construction

The tube contains no optical elements; its sole purpose is to move the lens farther from the image plane. The farther away the lens is, the closer the focus, the greater the magnification, and also the greater the loss of light (requiring a longer exposure time). Lenses classically focus closer than infinity by moving all optical elements farther from the film or sensor; an extension tube simply enables this movement. 

Because extension tubes do not have optics, they do not affect the optical quality of a lens. Because of their function, there are other effects: decrease of light; shallower depth of field; and loss of ability to focus at infinity. The longer the extension tube, the closer the lens can focus. Correspondingly, the amount of light and depth of field will be reduced. On modern cameras using auto exposure the decrease in exposure is all corrected for by the camera, but when not using auto exposure this has to be calculated and taken into account when setting exposure. The exposure compensation, called the bellows factor, is a dimensionless ratio that is applied to the relative aperture (f-number), resulting in the working f-number of the lens and extension tube combination.

The precise reduction of the amount of light reaching the imaging plane can be calculated using the inverse square law formula. 

Extension tubes without electrical contacts will not allow an electronic automatic camera to control the lens, thus disabling autofocus and in some cases forcing a user to shoot wide open unless the lens offers manual aperture control. More expensive extension tubes contain electrical contacts allowing the user to use autofocus and electronically control the aperture of the attached lens. An advantage to the non-electrical tubes is their lower price.

Other items like lens adapters may unintentionally have an effect similar to an extension tube. A lens designed for a small flange focal distance may not be able to focus to infinity when a lens adapter places the sensor too far away.

Versus teleconverters and close-up lens
Extension tubes are sometimes confused with teleconverters, an optical component (i.e., containing lenses) designed to increase effective focal length.

A close-up lens also enables focusing closer for macro photography but, unlike an extension tube, a close-up lens actually is an optical element.

See also
 Bellows (photography)
 Reversing ring

References

External links
 
Experiments with Close-up Lenses and Extension Tubes

Photography equipment